This page lists notable people from Dagestan.

Historical figures

Abdulkhakim Ismailov (1916–2010), World War II soldier. He was photographed by Yevgeny Khaldei raising the flag of the Soviet Union over the Reichstag in Berlin on 2 May 1945, days before Nazi Germany's surrender.
Abdullah ad-Daghestani (1891–1973), Sheikh of the Naqshbandi-Haqqani Sufi order
Gasret Aliev (1922–1981), soldier, awarded "Hero of Soviet Union" medal
Ghazi Muhammad (1793–1832), Islamic scholar and ascetic, who was the first Imam of the Caucasian Imamate (from 1828 to 1832).
Hadji Murad (1795 –1852), Avar leader during the resistance of the peoples of Dagestan and Chechnya in 1811–1864 against the incorporation of the region into the Russian Empire, he was also a rival to Imam Shamil.
Husenil Muhammad Afandi (1862–1967), Muslim spiritual leader, Sheikh of Naqshbandi tariqah
Imam Shamil (1797–1871), political, military, and spiritual leader of Caucasian resistance to Imperial Russia in the 1800s; his likeness is used within modern times as a symbol of resistance to Russian rule
Magomet Gadzhiyev (1907 – 1942), World War II submarine commander and hero of the Soviet Union
Maksud Alikhanov (1846–1907), Russian Lieutenant-General, Merv District Head and Tiflis Governor
Said Afandi al-Chirkawi (1937–2012), spiritual leader of Dagestani Muslims, Sheikh of Naqshbandi and Shazali tariqas
Vazif Meylanov (1940–2015), Soviet dissident, political prisoner, political activist

Arts

Alla Dzhalilova (1908–1992), ballerina, artist of the Dagestan Autonomous Soviet Socialist Republic
Anatoly Yagudaev (1935–2014), sculptor, held an honorary title of People's Artist of the Russian Federation 
Boris Gavrilov (1908–1990), Soviet writer, poet, dramatist 
Mikhail Gavrilov (1926–2014), Soviet writer, poet 
Daniil Atnilov (1913–1968), Soviet poet
Eduard Puterbrot (1940–1993), Dagestan artist and member of the USSR Union of Artists.
Fazu Aliyeva (1932-2016), poet, novelist and journalist
Hizgil Avshalumov (1913–2001), Soviet novelist, poet, playwright; wrote in Juhuri (language of the Mountain Jews) as well as in Russian
Israel Tsvaygenbaum (b. 1961), Russian-American artist
Maksud Sadikov (1963–2011), Rector (Islam), professor in International Relations
Manuvakh Dadashev (1913–1943), Soviet poet
Mishi Bakhshiev (1910–1972), Soviet poet
Mushail Mushailov (1941–2007), painter, member of the USSR Union of Artists and Israel
Rasul Gamzatov (1923–2003), Avar poet, writer, political activist
Sergey Izgiyayev (1922–1972), Mountain Jew Soviet poet, playwright, translator
Suleyman Stalsky (1869-1937),poet
Tamara Musakhanov (1924–2014), sculptor, ceramist, member of the USSR Union of Artists and Israel
Tankho Israelov (1917–1981), ballet dancer, choreographer, People's Artist of the USSR (c. 1978)
Zoya Semenduev (1929–2020), Soviet poet

Boxing

Abdulkadir Abdullayev (b. 1988), In 2015 he won a gold medal at the European Games and a bronze at the world championships
Albert Batyrgaziev (b. 1998), Winner of the gold medal in the featherweight division at the 2020 Summer Olympics
Albert Selimov (b. 1986), He is best known for being the only man to defeat Vasyl Lomachenko in the amateur ranks. Competing for Russia he won the 2007 world title, the 2008 World Cup, and two European titles, in 2006 and 2010
Ali Aliyev (b. 1983), Russian amateur boxer best known for winning the 2006 European Amateur Boxing Championships
Arslanbek Makhmudov (b. 1989), Russian professional boxer who has held the WBC-NABF heavyweight title since 2019
Arthur Biyarslanov (b. 1995), Undefeated professional boxer who won a Gold Medal in the Pan American Games, and competed in the 2016 Summer Olympics
Artur Beterbiev (b. 1985), Professional Boxer who is currently holding the IBF light-heavyweight title since 2017 and the WBC light heavyweight title since 2019
Gaydarbek Gaydarbekov (b. 1976), Boxer of Avar heritage, who has won two Olympic medals in Middleweight including the gold medal at the 2004 Summer Olympics.Today he is perhaps best known for defeating future boxing superstar Gennady Golovkin in the 2004 Olympic finals
Gazimagomed Jalidov (b. 1995), olympian at 2020 Summer Olympics, arrived in Spain as a refugee in 2004
Kamil Djamaloudinov (b. 1979), won the bronze medal in the featherweight division (– 57 kg) at the 2000 Summer Olympics in Sydney, Australia
Khabib Allakhverdiev (b. 1982), professional Boxer; former WBA, IBO, Super Welterweight champion
Magomed Abdulhamidov (b. 1986), olympic boxer who garnered mainstream attention when he was controversially disqualified during the 2012 Olympic Games several hours after he was initially declared the winner of his bronze medal match
Magomed Abdusalamov (b. 1981), is a Russian former heavyweight professional boxer who competed from 2008 to 2013; in 2013, Abdusalamov was forced to retire from the sport due to severe brain injuries sustained during his only career defeat
Magomed Aripgadjiev (b. 1977), won a silver medal in the light heavyweight division (– 81 kg) at the 2004 Summer Olympics
Magomed Kurbanov (b. 1995), undefeated Russian professional boxer who fights as a light middleweight
Magomed Omarov (b. 1989), super Heavyweight amateur boxer best known to win the 2011 European Amateur Boxing Championships
Magomedrasul Majidov (b. 1986), won a bronze medal in the super-heavyweight division (+91kg) at the 2012 Summer Olympics and gold medals at the 2017, 2013 and 2011 World Championship
Muslim Gadzhimagomedov (b. 1997), won a Silver Medal at the 2020 Summer Olympics in the Heavyweight division
Nurmagomed Shanavazov (b. 1965), best known for handling Riddick Bowe his first defeat at an international competition
Radzhab Butaev (b. 1995), Russian professional boxer who challenged once for the WBA (Regular) welterweight title in 2019
Ruslan Khairov (b. 1976), He competed in the Welterweight (– 69 kg) division, and won bronze medals at the 2003 World Amateur Boxing Championships and 2004 European Amateur Boxing Championships
Sultan Ibragimov (b. 1975), retired professional boxer held the WBO heavyweight title from 2007 to 2008. As an amateur he won silver medals at the 2000 Olympics and 2000 European Championships, and bronze at the 2001 World Championships, all in the heavyweight division
Zemfira Magomedalieva (b.1988) won a Bronze medal in Boxing at the 2020 Summer Olympics at Women's middleweight

Business and Politics

Adam Amirilayev (b. 1967), politician
Ahmad Afandi Abdulaev (b. 1959), mufti of Dagestan
Magomedali Magomedov (b. 1930), politician who served as the Head of the State Council of Dagestan from 1992 to 2006.
Magomedsalam Magomedov (b. 1964), politician who served as Head of the Republic of Dagestan. Son of Magomedali Magomedov
Mukhu Aliyev (b. 1940), politician who served as Head of the Republic of Dagestan
Ramazan Abdulatipov (b. 1946), politician who served as Head of the Republic of Dagestan
Sevil Novruzova (c. 1977), lawyer, advocate for returning former Islamist insurgents
Suleyman Kerimov (b. 1966), businessman, investor, philanthropist and politician; featured on Forbes list as one of the richest people in Russia; founded the Suleyman Kerimov Foundation as a vehicle for charitable projects
Ramazan Abdulatipov (b. 1946), politician who served as Head of the Republic of Dagestan
Ziyavudin Magomedov (b. 1968), Russian billionaire businessman

Fencing
Vladimir Nazlymov (b. 1945), six time medalist in the Olympic Games, including three Gold medals in Fencing

Football

Adil Ibragimov (b. 1989), football player
Akhmed Kurbanov (b. 1986), former football player
Albert Gadzhibekov (b. 1988), former professional football player of Lezgin descent
Aleksandr Maslov (b. 1969), football coach, former player
Ali Gadzhibekov (b. 1989), football player of Lezgin descent
Alibek Aliev (b. 1996), born in Russia, represents Sweden internationally, relocated to Sweden at the age of six
Alikadi Saidov (b. 1999), football player
Amir Gasanov (b. 1987), former professional football player
Anvar Gazimagomedov (b. 1988), professional football player, plays as a right midfielder
Arslan Aydemirov (b. 1977), former midfielder
Arslan Khalimbekov (b. 1967), former midfielder, manager
Azim Fatullayev (b. 1986), defensive midfielder, centre back
Dzhamal Dibirgadzhiyev (b. 1996), striker, forward
Gadzhi Bamatov (b. 1982), former Forward (association football)
Gamid Agalarov (b. 2000), centre-forward
Islamnur Abdulavov (b. 1994), forward
Kamalutdin Akhmedov (b. 1986), former defender
Kamil Agalarov (b. 1988), Right Back
Magomed-Shapi Suleymanov (b. 1999), winger
Mahammad Mirzabeyov (b. 1990), right back
Mehdi Jannatov (b. 1992), Goalkeeper
Mikhail Kupriyanov (b. 1973), manager, former defender
Murad Hüseynov (b. 1989), forward
Murad Magomedov (b. 1973), defender, holds an Israeli identity card
Mutalip Alibekov (b. 1997), centre back
Nikita Chistyakov (b. 2000), left-back
Nikita Timoshin (b. 1988), defender, midfielder
Ramazan Isayev (b. 1998), forward
Rasim Tagirbekov (b. 1984), defender, midfielder of Lezgin descent
Ruslan Agalarov (b. 1974), midfielder
Rustam Gadzhiyev (b. 1978), defender
Rustam Khalimbekov (b. 1996), defender, midfielder
Said Aliyev (b. 1998), forward
Serder Serderov (b. 1994), winger, forward
Sergei Dementyev (b. 1971), former midfielder
Sergei Kozhanov (b. 1964), defender, midfielder, striker
Shamil Asildarov (b. 1983), striker
Shamil Gasanov (b. 1993), defender, midfielder
Shamil Lakhiyalov (b. 1979), former forward of Avar ethnicity
Shamil Saidov (b. 1982), former goalkeeper
Sharif Mukhammad (b. 1990), centre back, defensive midfielder
Valiabdula Magomedov (b. 1986), former midfielder
Viktor Kuzmichyov (b. 1992), midfielder, defender
Yuri Udunyan (b. 1994), midfielder, defender

Judo
Mansur Isaev (b. 1986), In 2012, he won the gold medal in judo at the 2012 Summer Olympics
Rasul Salimov (b. 1981), won a Bronze medal at the 2001 World Judo Championships
Tagir Khaybulaev (b. 1984), In the 2012 Summer Olympics, Khaybulaev won a gold medal for Judo

Mixed martial arts

Abdulmanap Nurmagomedov (1962–2020), late founder and head trainer of Eagles MMA, the head training camp for all Dagestani Combat Sports Athletes; father and coach of former UFC lightweight champion Khabib Nurmagomedov
Abubakar Nurmagomedov (b. 1989), MMA Fighter currently competing in the UFC's Welterweight division
Ali Bagautinov (b. 1985), former UFC fighter in the flyweight division. Combat Sambo World Champion
Askar Askarov (b. 1992), former UFC fighter in the flyweight division. 2017 Summer Deaflympics 61 kg freestyle wrestling gold medalist
Bekbulat Magomedov (b. ), MMA fighter currently competing for the Professional Fighters League
Bozigit Ataev (b. 1979), MMA Fighter for Professional Fighters League, known for a fierce spinning heel kick and Sambo style grappling
Gadzhimurad Antigulov (b. 1987), MMA Fighter currently competing in the UFC's Lightheavyweight division
Gasan Umalatov (b. 1982), MMA Fighter currently competing in the UFC's Middleweight division
Ikram Aliskerov (b. 1992), World Combat Sambo Champion, and UFC fighter from Russia
Islam Makhachev (b. 1991), Current UFC lightweight champion of the world
Islam Mamedov (b. 1989?), MMA Fighter currently competing in the PFL
Karimula Barkalaev (b. 1973), former MMA fighter who is the only Russian national to have won at the ADCC Submission Fighting World Championship
Khabib Nurmagomedov (b. 1988), Former UFC fighter in the lightweight division, retiring in 2020 as undisputed lightweight champion and former #1 pound-for-pound UFC fighter
Magomed Ankalaev (b. 1992), MMA Fighter currently competing in the UFC's Light Heavyweight Division
Magomed Bibulatov (b. 1988), Chechnyan born, Dagestani raised MMA Fighter and former PFL Flyweight Champion currently competing in the UFC's flyweight division
Magomed Mustafaev (b. 1988), MMA Fighter currently competing in the UFC's Lightweight division
Magomedkhan Amanulayevich Gamzatkhanov (b. 1961), Gamzatkhanov is better known by his ringname "Volk Han", Russian MMA pioneer, head trainer for Fedor Emelianenko; retired w/ a record of 21-8-1
Magomedrasul Khasbulaev (b. 1986), nicknamed "Frodo", mixed martial artist of Avar heritage at one time fought in the Featherweight division for the Bellator Fighting Championships
Muslim Salikhov (b. 1984), known for being the only non-Chinese "King of sanda", Muslim Salikhov is often acknowledged as one of the best Wushu Sanda competitors in history; current UFC fighter in the welterweight division
Omari Akhmedov (b. 1987), MMA Fighter currently competing in the UFC's Middleweight division
Ramazan Emeev (b. 1987), MMA Fighter currently competing in the UFC's Middleweight division
Rashid Magomedov (b. 1984), MMA Fighter currently competing in the UFC's Lightweight division
Rasul Mirzaev (b. 1986), World Combat Sambo champion, and MMA Fighter currently competing in the Featherweight division
Roman Kopylov (b. 1991?) Siberian born, Dagestani raised MMA Fighter currently competing in the UFC's middleweight division
Ruslan Ashuraliyev (1950–2009), was 2 time world champion and Olympic Bronze Medalist; served two terms in the Dagestani parliament
Ruslan Magomedov (b. 1986), MMA Fighter currently competing in the UFC's Heavyweight division
Rustam Khabilov (b. 1986), MMA Fighter currently competing in the UFC's Lightweight division; Combat Sambo World Champion
Said Nurmagomedov (b. 1992), MMA Fighter currently competing in the UFC's Welterweight Division
Saparbek Safarov (b. 1986), MMA Fighter currently competing in the UFC's Light Heavyweight Division
Shamil Abdurakhimov (b. 1981), MMA Fighter currently competing in the UFC's Heavyweight division
Shamil Gamzatov (b. 1990), MMA Fighter currently competing in the UFC's Light Heavyweight division
Shamil Zavurov (b. 1984), Combat Sambo World champion (x3) and MMA fighter currently competing in both the Lightweight and Welterweight divisions
Sultan Aliev (b. 1984), MMA Fighter currently competing in the UFC's Welterweight division
Umar Nurmagomedov (b. 1996), MMA Fighter currently competing in the UFC's Bantamweight division
Usman Nurmagomedov (b. 1998) MMA Fighter currently competing in the Bellator's Lightweight division
Zabit Magomedsharipov (b. 1991), MMA Fighter currently competing in the UFC's Featherweight division

Muay Thai
Alaverdi Ramazanov (b. 1994), Russian Muay Thai kickboxer who is currently signed to ONE Championship. He is the inaugural and reigning ONE Kickboxing Bantamweight World Champion; Ramazanov is also a former 3-time IFMA Muay Thai World Champion and 12-time Russian national Muay Thai champion
Dzhabar Askerov (b. 1986), he is the World Muay Thai Council's Muay Thai Welterweight European Champion and K-1 MAX Scandinavia 2008 Tournament Finalist
Magomed Magomedov (b. 1982), the professional WMC and IMF[clarification needed] Light Heavyweight World Muay Thai Champion
Ramazan Ramazanov (b. 1984), nicknamed "The Punisher", Ramazanov is a multiple time Muay Thai world champion

Taekwondo
Patimat Abakarova (b. 1994), First female athlete from Dagestan region to medal in the Olympics, via a bronze medal in Taekwondo during the 2016 Olympic Games
Radik Isayev (b. 1984), Gold medalist at 2016 Summer Olympics

Wrestling

Abdulrashid Sadulaev (b. 1996), freestyle wrestler, a three-time World Champion (2014, 2015, 2018), European Champion (2014), European Games Champion (2015), two time Cadet World Champion (2012, 2013), Golden Grand-Prix Champion, Olympic Gold Medalist (2016, 2020)
Abdusalam Gadisov (b. 1989), 2014 Freestyle Wrestling World Champion
Adam Batirov (b. 1985), Olympic Wrestler, 2018 World Championship Runner-up; Younger brother of Mavlet Batirov
Adam Saitiev (b. 1977), Russia's freestyle wrestler, a Chechen, Russian Master of sports of international class, Honored Master of Sports of Russia (2000), three-time champion of Russia (1999, 2000, 2002), three-time champion Europe (1999, 2000, 2006), two-time world champion (1999, 2002), Olympic champion (2000)
Ali Aliyev (1937–1995), Avar Dagestani-born Soviet Union freestyle wrestler, won five world titles
Ali Isaev (b. 1983), Olympic Heavyweight Freestyle Wrestler, Undefeated MMA Fighter
Bekkhan Goygereyev (b. 1987), wrestler who won the gold medal at the 2013 World Wrestling Championships
Buvaisar Saitiev (b. 1975), Russia's freestyle wrestler, three-time Olympic champion, six-time world champion, six-time European champion, five-time Russian champion, seven-time winner of the tournament Krasnoyarsk Ivan Yarygin winner Goodwill Games will, currently is an acting State Duma Deputy from Dagestan
Dzhamal Otarsultanov (b. 1987), won the gold medal in men's freestyle 55 kg at the 2012 London Olympics
Khadzhimurad Magomedov (b. 1974), Olympic gold medalist, two time world wrestling champion
Kuramagomed Kuramagomedov (b. 1978), freestyle wrestler who competed for Russia in the 2000 Summer Olympics, won a world title in 1997
Magomed Ibragimov (b. 1974), three time Olympian for Freestyle Wrestling; Bronze Medalist at the 2000 Summer Olympics
Magomed Kurbanaliev (b. 1992), freestyle wrestler, World freestyle wrestling champion 2016 in 70 kg
Magomedkhan Aratsilov (b. 1951), former wrestler who competed in the 1980 Summer Olympics
Magomedrasul Gazimagomedov (b. 1991), won gold medal at the 2015 World Wrestling Championships at Men's freestyle 70 kg, training partner of Khabib Nurmagomedov
Magomed Ibragimov (b. 1985), Bronze Medalist on freestyle wrestling during 2016 Olympic Games
Mahamedkhabib Kadzimahamedau (b. 1994), Olympic Silver Medalist (2020)
Makhach Murtazaliev (b. 1984), Russian Olympic wrestler who won the bronze medal for Russia at the 2004 Summer Olympics in Athens
Marid Mutalimov (b. 1980), 2008 Bronze Medalist in freestyle wrestling during the Olympic Games
Mavlet Batirov (b. 1983), freestyle wrestler, world and  two time Olympic champion, competed in the men's freestyle 55 kg category at the 2004 Summer Olympics and won the gold medal
Magomedgasan Abushev (b. 1959), Olympic Gold Medalist (1980) in Freestyle wrestling
Murad Umakhanov (b. 1977), Umakhanov competed at the 2000 Summer Olympics in Sydney where he received a gold medal in Freestyle wrestling
Ramazan Şahin (b. 1983), Irbaikhanov – Olympic Gold Medalist (2008), World Champion (2007) in Freestyle wrestling
Sagid Murtazaliev (b. 1974), two time World champion, Olympic champion in Freestyle wrestling
Saypulla Absaidov (b. 1958), Olympic champion and World Champion 1981 in Freestyle wrestling
Sazhid Sazhidov (b. 1980), Russian Olympic wrestler who represented Russia at the world-level from 2003 to 2006, won the bronze medal at the 2004 Athens Olympics
Sharif Sharifov (b. 1988), Olympic Gold Medalist (2012), World Champion (2011) in Freestyle wrestling
Shirvani Muradov (b. 1985), wrestler, who has won a gold medal at the 2008 Summer Olympics and European champion 2007
Yusup Abdusalomov (b. 1977), Silver Medalist during the 2008 Olympic Games in freestyle wrestling
Zagalav Abdulbekov (b. 1945), two time world champion, Olympic Gold Medalist in freestyle wrestling, coach of the Soviet freestyle wrestling team between 1974 to 1980
Zaur Uguev (b. 1995), claimed the 2020 Summer Olympic Games gold medal after back-to-back World Championships in 2018 and 2019, as well as a 2020 Individual World Cup title; first fighter to ever be signed by UFC without ever competing in MMA

Dagestan
People from Dagestan
People of Dagestani descent